Pogledni me v otchite (Bulgarian: Погледни ме в очите; English: Look into my eyes) is the first studio album of the Bulgarian pop-folk singer Anelia. The album was sold in 100 000 copies in Bulgaria - the best selling album in the country for 2003 and produced three consecutive number one hits for Anelia. It features her breakthrough single "Pogledni me v otchite", the first number one single by Anelia in the Bulgarian charts. The other singles released from the album were "Samo mene niamash" [also peaked at #1] and "Chuzdni ustni".
The remix of the lead single topped the chart after the original song.

Track listing

  Погледни ме в очите (Remix) 4:51
  Само тази нощ 3:11
  Лед и огън 5:14
  Не ме лъжи 4:11
  Прости 3:56
  Само мене нямаш 3:36
  Без теб 3:36
  Чужди устни 3:44
  Сама 3:58
  Не искай 3:48
  Погледни ме в очите 4:11

Charts

Weekly albums chart

Year-end chart

2002 albums
Anelia albums
Bulgarian-language albums